Symmoca designella is a moth in the family Autostichidae. It was described by Gottlieb August Wilhelm Herrich-Schäffer in 1855 from Banat.

References

Moths described in 1855
Symmoca